Annette Arkeketa is a writer, poet, and playwright, and a member of the Otoe-Missouria Tribe of Oklahoma. She has conducted professional workshops in these fields, in addition to the creative process, script consulting, and documentary film making. She directed Native American film studies at Comanche Nation College.

Career 
Arkeketa also has Muscogee Creek ancestry. Her essay, "Repatriation: Religious Freedom, Equal Protection, Institutional Racism", was published in American Indian Thought (2004), a philosophical reader anthology, edited by Anne Water.

Arkeketa says,

Plays
Arkeketa's play Hokti has been produced by the Tulsa Indian Actors' Workshop (1997), Tulsa, Oklahoma and The Thunderbird Theatre (1998), Haskell Indian Nations University, Lawrence, Kansas.

Hokti is published in Stories of Our Way: An Anthology of American Indian Plays, UCLA American Indian Studies Center, 1999.

Her play Ghost Dance has been performed at public readings at the Gilcrease Museum (2001), Tulsa, Oklahoma; Tulsa University (2002); American Indian Community House (2003), New York, New York. It has been performed with acting workshops in Lawton, Oklahoma. In spring 2004 the full-length drama was produced by the Institute of American Indian Arts, Drama Department. Ghost Dance is published in Keepers of the Morning Star: An Anthology of Native Women's Theater, UCLA American Indian Studies Center, 2003.

Documentaries
More recently Arkeketa has worked as a documentary producer and has formed the production company Hokte Productions. Hokte means 'woman' in the Muscogee language.

Her first documentary production was about Jimmy Pena, a visual artist from Corpus Christi: it is titled Intrinsic Spirit: The Artway of Jimmy Pena (2002, approximately 24 minutes). Pena's work is shown through his pieces as visual artist and muralist.

Her next work was Muh-Du Kee: Put Them Back (2004), a 1-hour documentary that follows Jimmy Arterberry, Comanche Nation NAGPRA coordinator, through the consultation process with Colorado state and federal institutions to repatriate the remains of his people. This documentary explores Arterberry's views about the NAGPRA process, archaeologists, policies, and solutions to a controversial human rights issues for Native Americans.

Pahdopony: See how deep the water is (2005) is a 21-minute film about the life of Juanita Pahdopony (Comanche), an artist, educator and activist.

Chief George (2009) examines Rev. George Akeen (Cheyenne/Wichita) and his peacekeeping mission to the Middle East.

Arkeketa is reported to be co-producing a piece called Being Indian in Oklahoma.  She is seeking a producer for a family feature film screenplay A Good Day to Dance. This a story of dance, family love, and what it takes to win.

Awards 

 In 2000, Arkeketa was named Mentor of the Year by the Wordcraft Circle of Native Writers and Storytellers.
 She was awarded the Writer of the Year for Playwriting in 1998 for her play Hokti by the Wordcraft Circle of Native Writers and Storytellers.

Work

Plays 
 Pahdopony: See How Deep the Water Is
 Ghost Dance, in Keepers of the Morning Star: An Anthology of Native Women's Theater, UCLA American Indian Studies Center. 
 Publisher's page for the book
 Hokti, in Stories of Our Way: An Anthology of American Indian Plays, Hanay Geiogamah and Jaye T. Darby (Editors), UCLA American Indian Studies Center, 1999.

Poetry 

 The Terms of a Sister, self-published.

Anthologies 

 American Indian Thought: Philosophical Essays, Anne Waters (editor), Blackwell Pub.
 Gatherings, Volume X, A Retrospective of the First Decade, Greg Young-Ing & Florene Belmore (editors), Penticton: Theytus Books
 Windward Review, edited by Patricia Wimberly, Texas A & M University, 1998.
 Gatherings, Volume VIII: Shaking the Belly, Releasing the Sacred Clown, Edited by Joyce B. Joe and Susan M. Beaver, Penticton: Theytus Books
 The Indian Summer issue of phati'tude Literary Magazine
 Gatherings, Volume VII, Standing Ground: Strength and Solidarity Amidst Dissolving Boundaries, co-edited by Kateri Akiwenzie Damm and Jeannette Armstrong, Penticton: Theytus Books
 Returning the Gift: Poetry and Prose from the First North American Native Writers' Festival, Sun Tracks Books, No 29), University of Arizona Press.
 Indian Market Magazine, Santa Fe, NM, 1994.
 Durable Breath: Contemporary Native American Poetry, John E. Smelcer, D. L. Birchfield (editors), Salmon Run Pub.
 Plains Native American Literature, Simon and Schuster, 1993.
 That's What She Said: Contemporary Poetry and Fiction by Native American Women, Rayna Green (editor), Indiana University Press.
 Oklahoma Indian Markings, edited by Francine Ringold, Nimrod, Arts and Humanities Council of Tulsa, 1989.

Writing available online 
 Too Much For The Average Indian IX.
 Too Much For The Average Indian XI.
 Too Much For The Average Indian XII.
 The terms of a sister
 Project Muse

External links

 projectHOOP, Honoring Our Origins and People
 Native American Women Playwrights Archive
 Hokte Productions

References

This article uses content from https://web.archive.org/web/20100421070254/http://www.nativewiki.org/Annette_Arkeketa, an article written by the NativeWiki user Kstrom who has licensed the text (see here) in a way that permits reuse under the Creative Commons Attribution-ShareAlike 3.0 Unported License. All relevant terms must be followed.

Native American poets
Native American dramatists and playwrights
American women poets
Living people
American women dramatists and playwrights
Writers from Oklahoma
Otoe people
Muscogee people
20th-century American dramatists and playwrights
20th-century American women writers
21st-century American dramatists and playwrights
21st-century American women writers
Year of birth missing (living people)
Native American women writers
20th-century Native American women
20th-century Native Americans
21st-century Native American women
21st-century Native Americans